Sayyad (Hunter) is a serie of solid fuel surface-to-air missiles (SAM) manufactured by Iran.

Sayyad-1 
Sayyad-1 is the Iranian upgraded version of the Chinese HQ-2 SAM, however it differs from the Chinese versions in guidance and control subsystems. Sayyad-1 is equipped with an about 200-kilogram warhead and has a speed of about 1,200 meters per second. The said missile is very different from the rest of Sayyad family of missiles (Sayyad-2 and the successor missiles are based on US designed RIM-66 Standard missiles).

Sayyad-2 

The Sayyad-2 is a canister-launched, reverse engineered version of the RIM-66 Standard Missile (SM-1) naval surface-to-air missile that Iran obtained from the United States before the 1979 revolution. It is an upgraded version of the Sayyad-1 system with higher precision, range and defensive power. The range of the Sayyad-2 missile is not known. Different sources claim various numbers, from 60 km to 120 km.

After the unveiling ceremony in November 2013, it became clear that the Sayyad-2 missile looks similar to the SM-2 Standard SAM missile but its control fins are similar to the Iranian medium-range TAER-2 SAM missile. It was also announced that it will have cooperation with the S-200 system via TALASH-2 interface system. It is planned that the Sayyad-2 missile will be added to Iranian Moudge-class frigates. Iranian defense minister announced that Sayyad-2 covers the medium range and high altitudes and it has a combined guidance system.

The launcher of Sayyad-2 missile that consists of 4 canisters in 2*2 configuration is one of the interesting things about this new Iranian surface to air missile because it has so much apparent similarity to American MIM-104 Patriot SAM system launchers.

Variant 
Mehrab is a naval version of the Sayyad-2.

Sayyad-3 
Sayyad-3 is a similar missile, but with a long-range capability. It has a similar diameter as Sayyad-2 but a longer body with different wings and control surfaces. Based on current estimates Sayyad-3 has a range of about 150–200 km. Iranian Defence Minister Hossein Dehghan stated the maximum range is about 120 km. This missile will be added to SAM systems via the TALASH-3 system. Sayyad-3 on
Khordad 15 (air defense system) is capable of detecting, intercepting, and destroying six targets simultaneously.
               
It appears that two new above missiles will be 
used in a similar manner to the Iranian long-range SAM system Bavar-373, to cover various ranges and altitudes. The missile can also be fired by the Talaash Air Defense System.

Sayyad-4 

Sayyad-4 (missile) is the upgraded version of Sayyad-3 with more range and better maneuverability.

Sayyad-4B 
Sayyad-4B was revealed on 5 November 2022. It has a range of 300 kilometers. It is used by the Bavar-373 SAM system.

See also
 Mersad
 Raad (air defense system)
 Ya Zahra

References

Surface-to-air missiles of Iran
Military equipment introduced in the 2010s